The PZL Bielsko SZD-51 Junior is a Polish single-seat training and club sailplane.

Development
The Junior was designed by Stanislaw Zientek, based on the SZD-47 which had originally been developed in the years 1973 - 1974 at the Research and Development Center in Bielsko-Biała.
The prototype SZD-51-0 was first flown on 31 December 1980, and was followed by the production version, the SZD-51-1, with a modified fuselage,
A total of 261 aircraft were built. The type was proposed for licence production in Brazil, but in the event only a single SZD-51-1 was built there.
The simplified SZD-51-2 was a runner up in the IGC World Class design contest.

Description
The SZD-51-1 "Junior" is a single-seat glider of fiberglass construction. Only the rudder is fabric covered. The fuselage has an internal tubular steel frame, a fixed main wheel and a tail wheel. The aircraft has a two-piece wing with a spar. Schempp-Hirth type airbrakes are fitted only on the top surface of the wing. Rudder pedals are adjustable. The control for the rudder is via cables but all other control surfaces are operated by rods. The Junior is characterized by good slow-flight characteristics and is very forgiving in flight. It is designed for early solo and club flying, but is certified for aerobatics and can be equipped for high-altitude flight and cloud flying.

Operational Service 
As of 2014 this glider is currently in use with 3 Wing AAFC of Australian Air Force Cadets.

Specifications (SZD-51-1)

See also

References

Citations

Bibliography
Sailplane Directory

SZD51
1980s Polish sailplanes
SZD aircraft
T-tail aircraft
Aircraft first flown in 1980